Maryse Abendanon (born 15 November 1966 in Amsterdam) is a former Dutch field hockey player, who earned a total number of seventeen international caps in 1987 for the Dutch women's team, in which she scored four goals. She was a member of the squad that won the inaugural Women's Champions Trophy in 1987.

Biography
Abendanon grew up in the city of Baarn, Netherlands. In her youth at the Baarnsch Lyceum she played in the national B- and later on A-teams. After her breakthrough as youth-player, she began to play at the highest level at that moment in the national competition. She did this at the hockey-club of Laren, Netherlands.

At the age of 18 she has been selected for 'Jong-Oranje', the Dutch national youth team. She also transfers herself to the Amsterdamsche Hockey & Bandy Club, the Amsterdam hockey-club. She would play by then sixteen times for the Dutch national team. In 1987 she won the Champions Trophy in Amstelveen and the EuroHockey Nations Championship.

After her career, she became a trainer at hockey-clubs in Muiderberg and Baarn, where she still lives and works.

References

  Dutch Hockey Federation

1966 births
Living people
Dutch female field hockey players
Field hockey players from Amsterdam
20th-century Dutch women
20th-century Dutch people